Michael Franks (born September 18, 1944) is an American singer and songwriter, considered a leader of the quiet storm movement. He has recorded with a variety of well-known artists, such as Patti Austin, Art Garfunkel, Brenda Russell, Claus Ogerman, Joe Sample, and David Sanborn. His songs have been recorded by  Gordon Haskell,  Shirley Bassey, The Carpenters, Kurt Elling, Diana Krall, Patti LaBelle,  Lyle Lovett, The Manhattan Transfer, Leo Sidran, Veronica Nunn, Carmen McRae, Ringo Starr and Natalie Cole.

Biography
Franks grew up in southern California with his father Thurman, his mother Vera, and two younger sisters. Although no one in his family was a musician, his parents loved swing music, and his early influences included Peggy Lee, Nat King Cole, Ira Gershwin, Irving Berlin, and Johnny Mercer. At age 14 Franks bought his first guitar, a Japanese Marco Polo for $29.95 with six private lessons included; those lessons were the only music education that he received.

At University High in San Diego, Franks discovered the poetry of Theodore Roethke with his off-rhymes and hidden meter. In high school, he began singing folk-rock, accompanying himself on guitar. Studying English at UCLA, Michael discovered Dave Brubeck, Patti Page, Stan Getz, João Gilberto, Antonio Carlos Jobim, and Miles Davis. He never studied music in college or later, but earned a Bachelor of Arts degree from UCLA in comparative literature in 1966 and a Master of Arts degree from the University of Oregon in 1968. He had a teaching assistantship in a Ph.D. program in American literature at the University of Montreal before returning to teach part-time at UCLA.

During this time Franks started writing songs, starting with the antiwar musical Anthems in E-flat (1968) starring Mark Hamill. He also composed music for the films Cockfighter (1974), starring Warren Oates, and Zandy's Bride (1974), starring Liv Ullmann and Gene Hackman. Sonny Terry and Brownie McGhee recorded three of his songs, including "White Boy Lost in the Blues" on their album Sonny & Brownie. Franks played guitar, banjo and mandolin on the album and joined them in touring.  In 1973, he recorded an eponymous album, later reissued as Previously Unavailable, which included the minor hit "Can't Seem to Shake This Rock 'n Roll."

In 1976 Franks released his second album The Art of Tea, which saw Franks begin a long relationship with Warner Bros. Records. The Art of Tea featured Joe Sample, Larry Carlton, and Wilton Felder of the Crusaders and included the hit song "Popsicle Toes". His third album, Sleeping Gypsy (1977), which includes the song "The Lady Wants to Know", was partially recorded in Brazil. Around this time, percussionist Ray Armando gave Franks a cabasa, which became a signature instrument for him to play on stage when he was not playing guitar. Burchfield Nines (1978), which includes the song "When the Cookie Jar Is Empty," reflects his move to New York City and features more of an East Coast sound. Since then, Franks recorded more than 15 albums.

His best known works include "When I Give My Love to You," "Popsicle Toes," "Monkey See, Monkey Do," "Lotus Blossom," "Tiger in the Rain," "Rainy Night in Tokyo," and "Tell Me All About It." His biggest hit came in 1983 with "When Sly Calls (Don't Touch That Phone)" from the album Passionfruit. Radio hits include "Your Secret's Safe With Me" from 1985's Skin Dive, and "Island Life" from 1987's The Camera Never Lies.

Michael Franks also recorded his cover version of "Christmas Time Is Here" (the Christmas classic) with jazz pianist David Benoit released in 1996 on Benoit's Christmas album, Remembering Christmas.

Discography

Studio albums

Live albums

Compilation albums

Singles
1975 - Popsicle Toes (U.S. Pop #43, U.S. AC #45)
1977 - The Lady Wants to Know
1978 - When the Cookie Jar Is Empty
1979 - When It's Over
1980 - On My Way Home to You
1980 - One Bad Habit
1980 - Baseball
1982 - Jealousy
1982 - Love Duet (with Renee Diggs)
1982 - Comin' Home to You
1983 - Can't Seem to Shake This Rock 'n Roll
1985 - Your Secret's Safe with Me (U.S. AC #4, Canada AC #9)
1985 - When I Give My Love to You (with Brenda Russell)
1985 - Queen of the Underground
1985 - Michael Franks
1987 - Island Life
1987 - The Camera Never Lies
1987 - Doctor Sax / Face to Face
1990 - The Art of Love (U.S. R&B #59)
1990 - Speak to Me (U.S. R&B #73)
1991 - Practice Makes Perfect
1991 - Woman in the Waves
1992 - The Dream (with Yellowjackets)
1993 - Soulmate
1996 - Christmas Time Is Here (with David Benoit)
2003 - Christmas in Kyoto
2004 - Smash Up 1

Appears on

References

External links

1944 births
Living people
American jazz singers
Jazz musicians from California
Jazz songwriters
Jazz-pop singers
People from La Jolla, San Diego
MNRK Music Group artists
Reprise Records artists
Shanachie Records artists
Warner Records artists
Smooth jazz singers
University of California, Los Angeles alumni